Fihr ibn Malik, is counted among the direct ancestors of the Islamic prophet Muhammad. In the lineage of Muhammad from Adnan, Fihr precedes Muhammad by eleven generations.

Meaning of name 
Some writers stated that his name was also "Qarish" (hard, diminutive is "Quraysh"), which fits him being the progenitor of the Quraysh tribe. However most genealogists reject this version.

Ibn Ishaq's account 
According to Ibn Ishaq, Fihr defended Mecca against the Himyarite King of Yemen who wanted to transfer the Kaaba to Yemen.

Battle with Yemen 
A sharp engagement followed in which Himyar were defeated, and Hassan Bin Kilal Bin Dhi Hadath al-Himyari was taken prisoner by Fihr for two years until he paid his ransom. This story however was rejected by some Muslim scholars who argued that they have never heard of it and that Khuza'a in charge of Kabaa at the time of Hassan Ibn Kilal not Quraysh.

He is the common ancestor of all the ten promised paradise  through his sons Al Harith and Ghalib as all of them belonged to the Quraysh Tribe.

Role 
Fihr bin Malik led the people of Makkah to fight the armies of the Himyarite kingdom when they came to move Kaaba to Yemen, and succeeded in defeating the army. Fihr bin Malik mobilized a joint force consisting of Quraish, Bani Kinanah, Bani Khuzaimah, Bani Asad, Bani Judham, and several tribes  Mudhar. King Himyar Hassan bin Abdu Kalal bin Mathub bin Dzu Hurath al-Himyari was captured, and after three years was released after paying a ransom.

Fihr bin Malik looked after the needs of the pilgrims (Hajjis) who came to Mecca, and as a livelihood he traded with other Arab tribes.

Descendants 
From the marriage of Fihr bin Malik with Layla bint Al-Harith bin Tamim bin Sa'ad bin Hudzail bin Mudrikah from Banu Tamim, he had several children named Ghalib (who also had many descendants), Muharib, and Harith, Asad, Awf, Jawn, and Dhi'b. When Muhammad started the spread of Islam, the great tribes Quraish (Imarah Quraish) descendants of Fihr bin Malik who at that time lived in Mecca and its surroundings, are:

Quraish al-Batha' (Quraish of the valley) 

 Bani Adi bin Kaab bin Luayy bin Ghalib bin Fihr
 Bani Taim the son of Murrah, the son of Kaab, the son of Luayy, the son of Ghalib, the son of Fihr
 Bani Zuhrah the son of Kilab, the son of Murrah, the son of Kaab, the son of Luayy, the son of Ghalib, the son of Fihr.
 Bani Sahm son of Amr, son of Hushaish, son of Kaab, son of Luayy, son of Ghalib, son of Fihr.
 Bani Jumah bin Amr bin Hushaish bin Kaab bin Luayy bin Ghalib bin Fihr
 Bani Makhzum bin Yaqazhah bin Murrah bin Kaab bin Luayy bin Ghalib bin Fihr
 Ban Abdud-Dar bin Qushay bin Kilab bin Murrah bin Kaab bin Luayy bin Ghalib bin Fihr
 Bani Abdu Manaf bin Qushay bin Kilab bin Murrah bin Kaab bin Luayy bin Ghalib bin Fihr
 Bani Muttalib bin Abdu Manaf
 Ban Abdu Shams bin Abdu Manaf
 Ban Hashim bin Abdu Manaf
 Bani Nawfal bin Abdu Manaf
 Bani Asad bin Abdul Uzza bin Qushay bin Kilab bin Murrah bin Kaab bin Luayy bin Ghalib bin Fihr

Quraish az-Zawahir (Quraish fringe) 

 Bani Al-Harith bin Fihr
 Bani Muharib bin Fihr
 Ban Amir bin Luayy bin Ghalib bin Fihr

References 

Ancestors of Muhammad
3rd-century Arabs
People from Mecca
Kinana